The 2021 Cupa României Final was the final match of the 2020–21 Cupa României and the 83rd final of the Cupa României, Romania's premier football cup competition. It was played on 22 May 2021 between Astra Giurgiu and Universitatea Craiova and was the first major sports event in Romania to be played with fans in attendance during COVID-19 pandemic, though to a limited capacity.

The game took place on Ilie Oană in Ploiești, Universitatea Craiova claiming its eight cup after a 3–2 victory in extra time.

Route to the Final

Match

Notes

References

External links
 Official site 

2021
2020–21 in Romanian football
2020–21 Cupa României